Inouyia is an extinct genus from a well-known class of fossil marine arthropods, the trilobites. It lived during the Cambrian Period, which lasted from approximately 542 to 488 million years ago.

References

Ptychoparioidea
Ptychopariida genera
Cambrian trilobites
Fossils of India
Fossils of China